Simpson's Grove, also known as Hudson Farm, is a historic home located at Ironshire, Worcester County, Maryland, United States. It was built about 1800 and is a two-story, five bay, double pile Federal-style frame house. A brick dairy stands on the property. The exterior is sided in cypress.

Simpson's Grove was listed on the National Register of Historic Places in 1996.

References

External links
, including photo from 1990, at Maryland Historical Trust

Houses on the National Register of Historic Places in Maryland
Houses in Worcester County, Maryland
Federal architecture in Maryland
Houses completed in 1800
National Register of Historic Places in Worcester County, Maryland